Luiz Oliveira dos Santos Junior, known as Coquinho (Luziânia, January 21, 1980) is a Brazilian footballer who plays as a defensive midfielder, for the CRAC.

Career
In 2010 Plays for the Fortaleza on loan from Brasiliense. In July 2011, he moved to Itumbiara Esporte Clube.

Honours
Brasiliense
Campeonato Brasiliense: 2006, 2007, 2008, 2009

Fortaleza
Campeonato Cearense: 2010

Contract
 Fortaleza.

References

External links
 ogol
 WebSoccerClub
 futpedia.globo

1980 births
Living people
Brazilian footballers
Brasiliense Futebol Clube players
Itumbiara Esporte Clube players
Clube Recreativo e Atlético Catalano players

Association football midfielders
Sportspeople from Goiás